The 1979 Mississippi gubernatorial election took place on November 6, 1979, in order to elect the Governor of Mississippi. Incumbent Democrat Cliff Finch was term-limited, and could not run for reelection to a second term. As of 2020, this was the most recent election in which a Democrat won over 60 percent of the statewide vote in a gubernatorial election.

Democratic primary
No candidate received a majority in the Democratic primary, which featured 6 contenders, so a runoff was held between the top two candidates. The runoff election was won by former Lieutenant Governor William Winter, who defeated Lieutenant Governor Evelyn Gandy.

Results

Runoff

Republican primary
In the Republican primary, businessman and 1975 nominee Gil Carmichael defeated farmer and businessman Leon Bramlett.

Results

General election

Results

References

1979
gubernatorial
Mississippi
November 1979 events in the United States